Rogatec nad Želimljami (in older sources Hudi Rogatec) is a small settlement in the hills southeast of Golo in the Municipality of Ig in central Slovenia. The entire municipality is part of the traditional region of Inner Carniola and is now included in the Central Slovenia Statistical Region.

Name
The name of the settlement was changed from Rogatec to Rogatec nad Želimljami in 1955.

References

External links
Rogatec nad Želimljami on Geopedia

Populated places in the Municipality of Ig